Hailstorm is the second album recorded by guitarist Ross "the Boss" Friedman and his German band under the moniker, "The Ross the Boss Band".

Reception
It was released in the Fall of 2010 to positive reviews. A very positive review came from SMNnews where they said that "The band explore some good German power metal territory with its soaring guitar leads, precise drumming, catchy, anthemic choruses and melodic song structures. The band is more self-assured on their second release. Song writing contributions from the rest of the band has established themselves as important members of the band and not just Ross’ hired hands," concluding with how that if you liked New Metal Leader, you’ll definitely like Hailstorm. A reviewer from Danger Dog mentioned how "Continuing commentaries across the web have been suggesting that both the former and present Boss albums are what more recent Manowar works should or could have been like."

Track listing

Personnel

Band
Ross the Boss - guitar, keyboards, engineer
Patrick Fuchs - vocals, guitar
Carsten Kettering - bass
Matthias "Matze" Mayer - drums

Miscellaneous staff
Matze Mayer	- editing
Ross the Boss - recording, editing
Bella Hepp - engineering (assistant), editing
Dimitar Nikolov	- cover art, artwork
Oliver Szczypula - engineer, editing
John Rup, Matze Mayer, Bella Hep - engineers
Achim Köhler - engineer, mixing, and mastering at Indiscreet Audio, Stuttgart, Germany
Antonio Raimondo - editing
Ralf Stöcklmayer - orchestral arrangements (tracks 1, 11)

References

2010 albums
Ross the Boss albums
AFM Records albums